Agnes Porter (c.1752 – 1814) was a British governess known for her diaries.

Life
Porter was born in Edinburgh; her year of birth is uncertain but her birthday was 18 June. Her father was a member of the clergy. She was fluent in French and she had an interest in other languages. She became a governess and she is remembered because of her diaries and correspondence which survive for the period 1788 to 1814. Her correspondents included Elizabeth Moser and Valentine Green, author of Triumphs of Reason Examplified in Seven Tales (1791).

In 1788 Porter moved from Great Yarmouth to be a governess to the daughters of Ambrose Goddard M.P. The Goddard family lived at Swindon House in Wiltshire.

She was later governess to the children of Henry Fox-Strangways, 2nd Earl of Ilchester. She continued her care down the generations, educating the cousins Henry Fox Talbot, the pioneer of photography, and Christopher Rice Mansel Talbot, politician and industrialist.

Porter went to live with her former pupil Mary Talbot in 1799 at Penrice Castle, where she cared for her children. She retired in 1806 and went to live with her married sister. Porter died in Bruton, Somerset and was buried there. Porter's diaries and letters were discovered in Penrice Castle in the 1970s and this resulted in the 1998 publication of A Governess in the Age of Jane Austen. The Journals and Letters of Agnes Porter.

References 

1750s births
1814 deaths
Writers from Edinburgh
Scottish governesses
18th-century British non-fiction writers
19th-century British non-fiction writers
British memoirists
19th-century British women writers
18th-century British women writers
British women memoirists
18th-century diarists
19th-century diarists
18th-century English women
18th-century English people
19th-century English women
19th-century English people